Christopher Pope is an American politician serving as a member of the Montana Senate from the 31st district. He was previously a member of the Montana House of Representatives from 2015 to 2017 and again from 2019 to 2021.

References

1952 births
21st-century American politicians
Living people
Democratic Party members of the Montana House of Representatives
Democratic Party Montana state senators
University of Oregon alumni
Yale University alumni